The Monument to Felix Dzerzhinsky is a sculpture of Felix Dzerzhinsky, the first chairman of the Cheka,  in Dzerzhinsky Park in the city of Ufa in Bashkortostan, Russia.

History 

The statue was erected in Ufa in 1987 near the building of the Bashkir KGB (now - the building of the Prosecutor's Office of the Republic of Bashkortostan) in the park behind the "Rodina" cinema. The sculptor of the monument was the Leningrad artist Albert Seraphimovich Charkin. The sculpture was cast at the Leningrad plant "Monumentskulptura". Simultaneously with the installation of the monument, a row of poplars were planted behind it.

The popular name of the monument is "With his back to the Motherland" because the monument is behind the "Rodina" ("Motherland") cinema and is turned away from it.

See also 
 Monument to Felix Dzerzhinsky, Moscow

References

Monuments and memorials in Ufa
Statues in Russia
Sculptures in the Soviet Union
Outdoor sculptures in Russia
Sculptures of men in Russia
Cultural heritage monuments in Bashkortostan